Caliche may refer to:

Caliche, a hardened deposit of calcium carbonate.
Caliche slang, a collection of slang words unique to Central American Spanish.